Thomas Aldred (Aldriche, Alured) (by 1515 – 1562), of Kingston upon Hull, Yorkshire, was an English politician.

He was a Member (MP) of the Parliament of England for Kingston upon Hull in 1558.

References

1562 deaths
English MPs 1558
Politicians from Kingston upon Hull
Year of birth uncertain